Karl Carstens (14 December 1914 – 30 May 1992) was a German politician. He served as the president of West Germany from 1979 to 1984.

Early life and education
Carstens was born in the City of Bremen, the son of a commercial school teacher, who had been killed at the Western Front of World War I shortly before his birth. He studied law and political science at the universities of Frankfurt, Dijon, Munich, Königsberg, and Hamburg from 1933 to 1936, gaining a doctorate in 1938 and taking the Second Staatsexamen degree in 1939. In 1949 he also received a Master of Laws (LL.M.) degree from Yale Law School.

World War II

From 1939 to 1945, during the Second World War, Carstens was a member of an anti-aircraft artillery (Flak) unit in the Luftwaffe, reaching the rank of Leutnant (Second Lieutenant) by the war's end. In 1940 he joined the Nazi Party; reportedly, he had applied for admission in 1937 to avoid detrimental treatment when he worked as a law clerk. He had, however, joined the Nazi SA paramilitary organisation already in 1934.

Post-war years
In 1944 Carstens married the medical student Veronica Prior in Berlin. After the war he became a lawyer in his hometown Bremen, and from 1949 acted as a councillor of the city's Senate. From 1950 he also worked as lecturer at the University of Cologne, where he habilitated two years later. In 1954 he joined the diplomatic service of the German Foreign Office, serving as West German representative at the Council of Europe in Strasbourg. In 1955 he joined the Christian Democratic Union (CDU) under Chancellor Konrad Adenauer.

In July 1960 Carstens reached the position of secretary of state at the Foreign Office and in the same year was also appointed as professor for public and international law at University of Cologne. During the grand coalition government of 1966-1969 under Chancellor Kurt Georg Kiesinger, he first served as secretary of state in the Ministry of Defence, and after 1968 as head of the German Chancellery.

In 1972 Carstens was first elected into the Bundestag, of which he was a member until 1979. From May 1973 until October 1976 he was chairman of the CDU/CSU parliamentary group, succeeding Rainer Barzel. During that time he was an outspoken critic of left-wing tendencies in the German student movement and particular accused the governing Social Democratic Party of Germany (SPD) of being too soft on left-wing extremists. He also famously denounced the author and Nobel laureate Heinrich Böll as a supporter of left-wing terrorism (specifically, the Baader-Meinhof Gang) for his 1974 novel The Lost Honour of Katharina Blum.

After the 1976 federal elections, which made the CDU/CSU the largest group in parliament, Carstens was elected president of the Bundestag on 14 December 1976. The CDU/CSU had also reached a majority in the Federal Convention electing the President of Germany, and in 1979 the party nominated Carstens, though in contestation due to his Nazi past, as candidate, whereafter incumbent President Walter Scheel (FDP) chose to renounce a second term.

President of West Germany

On 23 May 1979, Carstens was elected as the fifth President of the Federal Republic of Germany, prevailing against the SPD candidate Annemarie Renger in the first ballot. During his term of office, Carstens was well known for hiking Germany in order to decrease the gulf between politics and the people.

In December 1982, the new Chancellor Helmut Kohl (CDU), recently elected in a successful motion of no confidence against Helmut Schmidt (SPD) deliberately lost a vote of confidence in the Bundestag, in order to obtain a clearer majority in new general elections. Though already former Chancellor Willy Brandt had similarly proceeded in 1972, this action gave rise to a discussion whether such a step constitutes a "manipulation of the Constitution". On 7 January 1983, President Carstens nonetheless dissolved the Bundestag and called for new elections. In February 1983 his decision was approved by the Federal Constitutional Court so that 1983 general elections could take place on 6 March.

In 1984 Carstens decided not to seek a second term on account of his age and left office on 30 June 1984. He was succeeded by Richard von Weizsäcker.

Carstens was a member of the Evangelical Church in Germany.

Literature
 Michael F. Feldkamp (ed.), Der Bundestagspräsident. Amt - Funktion - Person. 16. Wahlperiode, München 2007,

References

External links

 Interview with Karl Carstens at Historical Archives of the EU in Florence

1914 births
1992 deaths
20th-century presidents of Germany
Politicians from Bremen
Presidents of Germany
Luftwaffe personnel of World War II
German Lutherans
Presidents of the Bundestag
Members of the Bundestag for Schleswig-Holstein
Members of the Bundestag 1976–1980
Members of the Bundestag 1972–1976
Members of the Bundestag for the Christian Democratic Union of Germany
Yale Law School alumni
German scholars of constitutional law
Recipients of the Grand Star of the Decoration for Services to the Republic of Austria
Heads of the German Chancellery
Grand Crosses Special Class of the Order of Merit of the Federal Republic of Germany
Grand Crosses of the Order of Christ (Portugal)
Grand Collars of the Order of Saint James of the Sword
Grand Croix of the Légion d'honneur
20th-century Lutherans